Lhoknga (pronunciation [lhoʔ-ŋa], alternative names Lho'nga, Lho-nga, Lhok Nga), is a town within the district of the same name, in Aceh Besar Regency, Aceh Special Region, Indonesia, located on the western side of the island of Sumatra, 13 km southwest of Banda Aceh. It was completely flattened and destroyed by the 2004 Boxing Day Tsunami, where its population dwindled from 7,500 to 400. Tsunami runups following eyewitness accounts of waves were recorded being 35 m in height (waves landing at the height of 35 m), Such high and fast waves arising from the epicentre by megathrusts were later found to be due to splay faults, secondary faults arising due to cracking of the sea floor to jut upwards in seconds, causing waves' speed and height to increase.

Notes and references 

Populated places in Aceh
Aceh Besar Regency